Ferran Latorre Torres (born October 18, 1970) is a Spanish mountaineer and adventurer.

Biography 
At the age of fourteen, he began training as a member of the Hiking Club of Catalonia where he learned mountaineering and climbing. His fascination for climbing led him to the Pyrenees, the Alps, and the Himalayas. At the age of 21, he climbed Shishapangma.

Since 1998, Latorre has participated in the Spanish television program Al filo de lo impossible which documented his climbs in places such as Kyrgyzstan, Greenland, South George, Antarctica and the Himalayas. In 2017, he became the sixth Spanish mountaineer (and first Catalan) to ascend the 14 Eight-thousanders after climbing Mount Everest.

References

External links
 

1970 births
Living people
People from Barcelona
Spanish summiters of Mount Everest
Spanish mountain climbers
Athletes from Catalonia
Summiters of all 14 eight-thousanders